As Time Goes By is the tenth studio album by English tenor Alfie Boe. It was released on 23 November 2018 by Decca Records. The album peaked at number ten on the UK Albums Chart.

Background
The album mainly features recordings of songs from the 1930s. Boe has said of the album: "I knew from day one that I wanted it to be a New Orleans-style album with the vibe of the city. Even though the songs are mellow and chilled, the album has that style of playing that evokes a honky tonk piano."

Track listing

Charts

Certifications

References

2018 albums
Albums recorded at Capitol Studios
Alfie Boe albums
Decca Records albums
Vector Recordings albums